Tudor Cataraga (born 4 August 1956 in Seliște – 27 December 2010) was a sculptor from the Republic of Moldova.

Biography
From 1981 to 1984, Cataraga was a student in the sculpture department at the Saint Petersburg Academy of Arts. As a graduate student at the same Institution (1989), he worked with Professor Sergey Kubasov. He became a member of the Union of Artists of Moldova in 1993 and of the International Association of Arts (IAA-UNESCO) in 1997. In 2000, he was named chair of the Sculpture Department of the Union of Artists of Moldova.  In 2011, Cataraga and his wife were killed in a car accident.

Awards
1998 – The Prize of the Union of Plastic Artists from Romania for the sculpture The Man Bird (bronze, 36x19x12 cm, 1994). Now in the public collection of the Artists Union, Romania
2000 – Medal "Mihai Eminescu", awarded by the President of Romania
2001 – Order of the Star of Romania, Commander rank
 Awarded the National prize of the Culture ministry

About the artist

"...As a starting point for the understanding of the artist's repertory of shapes, I would suggest two monuments: Monument to Ion Dumeniuc, The Guarding Angel (stone, 1995, Central Orthodox Cemetery, Chișinău) and Mihai Eminescu (bronze, 1996, square of the "Mihai Eminescu" National Theatre), both of them representing visual arguments of a precise spiritual and historical identity.

The first monument is characteristic for the religious, spiritual aspect, always present in the sculptor's work. We can place the Guarding Angel project, first executed in baked clay and in a smaller form in 1990, into a larger family of works: Prayer (metal, 1991) and Sound of Sadness (baked clay, 1992). The "simplicity as a resolved complexity" Brancusi is an important key for the understanding of these works.

...for the monument to Mihai Eminescu, Tudor Cataraga selects only abstract principles, imagining a "cosmic" portrait of the national genius. Far more modern in visual expression, the sculptor is now free to play with three-dimensional elements and he conceives a rhythmical network that concentrates in the poet's figure /symbolic nucleus, without stirring the space, but comprimating. This second direction of his research, his playing with neo-expressionist forms can be seen in a series of his recent experimental works: The Woman-Crossbow (bronze, wood, 1994), The Man-Bird (bronze, granite, 1994), Motherhood (bronze, granite, 1998).

Tenacious in his research leading him from deductive to inductive thinking, without any disruption from his way, the sculptor's interest is gradually sliding to architectural constructions, and constructivism. The ever more pregnant abstract trend, the play with geometrical modules epitomise his fascination with the assemblage and with the rich relation "entity-detail": Genesis (wood, metal, 2000), Masterpiece (wood, metal, 2000). Tudor Cataraga, in his full artistic maturity, has the energy and the firm gesture of an inquisitive and attentive sculptor".

Monumental Works
1990 Archeology, bronze and stone
1990 Manole the Builder, chamotte
1994 Guarding Angel, funeral monument dedicated to Ion Dumeniuc, stone, Chișinău, Moldova
1994 Woman-Crossbow, bronze and wood
1995 Levitation, bronze and wood
1995 Human bird, bronze
1996 Mihai Eminescu, bronze-granite, Chișinău, Moldova
2000 Medieval Throne, sandstone, Ungheni, Moldova
2001 Beginning and End, granite, Changchun World Sculpture Park, Changchun, Jilin province, China
2002 Meeting in space, wood-stone-metal, Ungheni, Moldova
2002 Rigid fluidity, funeral monument dedicated to Andrei Sârbu, Chișinău, Moldova  
2004 Stephen III of Moldavia, stone, Nisporeni, Moldova
2005 Mihai Eminescu-bust, stone, Nisporeni, Moldova
2005 Meşterul Manole, stone, Criuleni, Moldova
2006 Dispersal in Time, stone, Ungheni, Moldova
2006 Dolmen, granite, Chișinău, Moldova
2006 Alexander I of Moldavia, bronze, Ialoveni, Moldova
2008 Leonardo Da Vince, stone, Technical University of Moldova
2008 Mihai Eminescu-bust, bronze, Iurceni, Moldova
2010 Alert Flying, graved stone stele dedicated to writer and diplomat Aurel Dragoș Munteanu, Buda village, Moldova
2010 Masa Raiului, mosaic-concrete, Sângeorz-Băi, Romania

Sculpture Camps
1992 Galda Moment, Alba-Iulia, Romania
1993 Nine Masters, George Apostu Art Center, Bacău, Romania
1993 Mold-Expo, Chișinău, Moldova
1997 First International Symposium of Bronze Sculpture, Chișinău, Moldova
1998 Second International Symposium of Bronze Sculpture, Chișinău, Moldova
2000, 2002, 2006 Stone Sculpture Symposium, Ungheni, Moldova
2001 International Sculpture Symposium, Changchun, Jilin province, China
2005 Stone Sculpture Symposium, Criuleni, Moldova
2008 Stone Sculpture Symposium, at Chișinău Technical University, Moldova
2009 Stone Sculpture Camp, Bran, Romania
2010 Sculpture Camp, Sângeorz-Băi, Romania

Personal exhibitions
1998 Gallery Latin America House, Bucharest, Romania
1999 Vasile Pogor Memorial House, Iași, Romania
2000 Parliament Hall, Bucharest, Romania 
2003 Center Constantin Brâncuși, Chișinău, Moldova
2005 UNHCR, Chișinău, Moldova
2005 Art exhibition at OSCE Mission, Chișinău, Moldova 
2006 National Museum of Art (MNAM), Chișinău, Moldova
2014 Cu pietate, in eternitate, in memory of Tudor Cataraga, curated by Tudor Braga (art critic), at the Exhibition Center Constantin Brâncuși, Chișinău, Moldova

Collective exhibitions
 1986 Youth's Palace, Saint Petersburg, Russia
 1987 Exhibition Center Saint Petersburg Manege, Russia
 1988 Contemporary History and Civilization, Saint Petersburg, Russia
 1989 Exhibition OHTA, Saint Petersburg, Russia
 1989 Leningrad and its inhabitants, Saint Petersburg Manege, Russia
 1989–2001 Moldova's Salon, Chișinău-Bacău-Bucharest
 1990,1994 Spring Salon, Exhibition Center Constantin Brâncuși, Chișinău, Moldova 
 1990 The Disciples of Art Academy of USSR Saint Petersburg, Russia
 1991 The Disciples of Art Academy of USS, Tbilisi, Georgia
 1991,2001 Autumnala '91 Exhibition Center Constantin Brancuși, Chișinău, Moldova 
 1992 Limba Noastră, Exhibition Center Constantin Brâncuși, Chișinău, Moldova 
 1992–1993 Bassarabian Artists in Bucharest, Art-Expo, Bucharest, Romania
 1995 Painting Exhibition, Düsseldorf, Germany
 1996 Art Exhibition, Budapest, Hungary
 1999 Art Exhibition, Strasbourg, France
 2000 Parliament Hall Art Exhibition, Bucharest, Romania
 2001–2010 December 1 – National Day of Romania, Chișinău, Moldova
 2002 Sculpture Exhibition, Constantin Brâncuși Exhibition Center, Chișinău, Moldova 
 2002 Painting Exhibition, Leone, France
 2003–2006 Orizont Eminescian, Constantin Brâncuși Exhibition Center, Chișinău, Moldova
 2004 Art Exhibition at National Museum, Chișinău, Moldova
 2005 Art Exhibition, Vilnius, Lithuania
 2006 Exhibition TsDH, Moscow/Krimskiy Val, Russia
 2006 Art from Republic of Moldova, Utrecht, Holland
 2006 Emergenţă Sala Rotonda, Iași, Romania
 2008 Exhibition Center Constantin Brâncuși, Chișinău, Moldova

Public collections
 National Art Museum of Moldova, Chișinău, Moldova
 Romanian Literature Museum, Chișinău, Moldova
 Romanian Literature Museum, Iași, Romania
 Moldova State University, Chișinău, Moldova
 Culture Center George Apostu, Bacău, Romania
 Artists Union of Romania, Constantin Brâncuși Exhibition Hall, Bucharest, Romania

References

1956 births
2010 deaths
People from Nisporeni District
Moldovan journalists
Male journalists
Moldovan sculptors
Moldovan writers
Romanian people of Moldovan descent
Commanders of the Order of the Star of Romania